Matthew William Catania (born April 2, 1976) is an American professional stock car racing driver and entrepreneur. He has competed in the ARCA Menards Series from 2013 to 2015.

Racing career
Catania grew up as the son of Bill Catania Sr. who was a frequent competitor at Stateline Speedway.

In 2006, Catania would attempt to make his ARCA Re/Max Series driving the No. 10 Ford for Andy Belmont Racing at Toledo Speedway, but failed to qualify for the event. He would attempt the season opener at Daytona International Speedway driving with Belmont, but would not qualify for that event as well.

Catania would return and make his debut in the now ARCA Racing Series in 2013, driving three races in his self-owned No. 18 Ford with a best finish of 17th on his debut at Berlin Raceway. For 2014, now running in a Chevrolet, he would run 12 of the 20 races on the schedule, earning his first top-10 in his penultimate race of the year at Salem Speedway. He would make one start the 2015 season, running at Daytona in a collaboration with Noel Saunders and Roo Motorsports, and finished 27th on the lead lap. This would be his most recent appearance in ARCA competition, although he has run in the 602 Limited Series and the Carolina Pro Late Model Series, with his most recent start coming in 2021 in the latter series.

Business career
Catania founded and is the CEO of OneRail, a final mile logistics orchestration program, as well as Move 24/7, which is operated by On Demand Technologies Inc., which Catania is the founder of. He also founded RaceFan Inc. in this senior year at Cornell University.

Personal life
Catania attended and graduated from Cornell University.

Motorsports results

ARCA Racing Series
(key) (Bold – Pole position awarded by qualifying time. Italics – Pole position earned by points standings or practice time. * – Most laps led.)

References

American businesspeople
American motorsport people
ARCA Menards Series
Cornell University alumni
1976 births
Living people